Ashland is a Canadian community in Carleton County, New Brunswick.

Ashland is located 3.71 km south of Coldstream.

History

A post office branch was established there in 1876 and was removed in 1914. In 1898, Ashland was a settlement with 1 post office and a population of 90.

Notable people

See also
List of communities in New Brunswick

References
 
 

Communities in Carleton County, New Brunswick